Aloysius Philip Schwartz (September 18, 1930 – March 16, 1992), commonly known as Fr. Al Schwartz, was an American Roman Catholic priest who began charity programs for poor orphans in Korea, the Philippines, and Mexico, and founded the Sisters of Mary of Banneux and the Brothers of Christ. He is venerated in the Catholic Church, having been declared Venerable by Pope Francis.

Early life and family
Schwartz was born in Washington, D.C., United States to Louis Schwartz and Cedelia Bourassa, the third of eight children. His father sold furniture door-to-door, and his mother had come to work in Washington, D.C., during the First World War, where she met her future husband. His mother died of cancer when he was 16 years old.

Seminary life and ordination
In 1944, he entered St. Charles Seminary in Maryland. He finished his B.A. degree at Maryknoll College.

He came to know the Belgian Société des Auxiliaires des Missions (S.A.M.), founded by Vincent Lebbe, the so-called "Apostle of Modern China." Its primary purpose was to organize European secular priests working under indigenous bishops' jurisdictions in Africa and Asia. He studied theology at Louvain Catholic University in Belgium. He would spend his vacations helping at the rag pickers’ camps for French society's derelicts.

He was ordained as a diocesan priest on June 29, 1957, at St. Martin's Church, Washington D.C., by Bishop McNamara. He offered to work under the Bishop of Busan in South Korea. He was accepted and legally separated from the S.A.M.

Work in Korea and the Philippines
On December 8, 1957, he arrived in Korea. As a consequence of the Korean War, there were many widows, orphans, beggars, and street children. Almost one-half of the adult population were not employed productively, so they resorted to selling rags and waste paper, begging, and stealing.

One day he collapsed while saying Mass, and was diagnosed with hepatitis. His recovery was slow, so he was advised to go back to the United States; without money for his fare, he begged for transportation by an American ship. In the US, he made mission appeals at parish masses on Sundays to raise funds for the poor in Korea.

In December 1961, he returned to Korea and was assigned as a pastor of St. Joseph's Parish. He organized the Legion of Mary ladies to assist him in helping the poor. He founded the Religious Congregation of the Sisters of Mary on August 15, 1964, in Anam-dong and, on May 10, 1981, the Brothers of Christ.

Together with the sisters and brothers, Schwartz established Boystowns and Girlstowns to care for and educate the orphans, street children, and children of impoverished families up to their late teens. They also built hospitals and sanatoriums for very needy patients and hostels for homeless and disabled older men, mentally disabled children, and unwed mothers.

In 1983 he was a recipient of the Ramon Magsaysay Award for International Understanding, an award given annually in honour of President Ramón F. Magsaysay. He met Cardinal Jaime Sin, the then Archbishop of Manila, who invited him to set up his Religious Community in the Archdiocese of Manila.

In 1985 he founded the Sisters of Mary at Sta. Mesa, Manila, expanding his charity programs. Buildings were constructed, and children from the slum and impoverished areas were recruited.

Illness and death
In 1989, he was diagnosed to have a terminal illness, amyotrophic lateral sclerosis (ALS). Despite his deteriorating health, he established Boystown and Girlstown in Mexico, which he called his "unfinished symphony." His illness made him immobile, and he continued his work in a wheelchair. He celebrated Mass daily, prayed, heard confessions, and preached. Schwartz died on March 16, 1992, at the Girlstown in Manila, and was buried at the Boystown in Silang, Cavite, now Girlstown.

Legacy
The Sisters of Mary and the Brothers of Christ continue to serve tens of thousands of the poorest of the poor in Korea, the Philippines, Mexico, Guatemala, Brazil, Honduras, and Tanzania. More than 170,000 impoverished children have graduated from their boarding schools and are now gainfully-employed, others become successful in their own businesses and some have become priests and religious following the example of Venerable Msgr. Aloysius Schwartz.

The official opening of the Causes of Beatification and Canonization of Aloysius Schwartz took place at the Minor Basilica of the Immaculate Conception, Metropolitan Cathedral, Intramuros, Manila, the Philippines, on December 10, 2003. On May 29, 2004, at The Sisters of Mary Girlstown Complex, Bo. Biga, Silang Cavite, Philippines, Socrates B. Villegas, Auxiliary Bishop of Manila and Episcopal Delegate on behalf of Gaudencio Rosales, Archbishop of Manila, declared the archdiocesan process of the beatification and canonization of Aloysius Schwartz closed.

On October 6, 2012, the Positio Super Vita Virtutibus et Fama Sanctitatis was submitted to Cardinal Angelo Amato, the Prefect of the Congregation for the Causes of Saints. The Theologians studied it. The Special Congress of the Theological Consultors gave its favorable vote on March 6, 2014. The cardinals and bishops in the Ordinary Session of December 16, 2014, chaired by Cardinal Angelo Amato, affirmed that Aloysius Schwartz had exercised the theological, cardinal, and concomitant virtues to a heroic degree.

On January 22, 2015, Pope Francis ordered that the Decree of the Heroic Virtues of Venerable Aloysius Schwartz be promulgated. On March 14, 2015, a Eucharistic Celebration, presided over by Cardinal Luis Antonio Tagle of Manila, was held at the Sisters of Mary Girlstown in Silang, Cavite, the Philippines in thanksgiving for the Promulgation of the Decree, attended by the Sisters of Mary, Brothers of Christ and almost nine thousand children of Fr. Al's Boystowns and Girlstowns, graduates from Korea, Philippines, and Mexico, benefactors and friends from different countries.

External links
 The Sisters of Mary Schools
 World Villages for Children
 Fr. Al's Children Foundation, Inc.
 Alumni of the Sisters of Mary School, Inc. (ASMSI)
 The Brothers of Christ of Banneux
 Sisters of Mary of Bannuex
 Father Al's Journey Toward Sainthood

1930 births
1992 deaths
20th-century American Roman Catholic priests
20th-century venerated Christians
American venerated Catholics
Miriam College alumni
People from Washington, D.C.
Venerated Catholics by Pope Francis